In a work of media adapted from a real or fictional narrative, a composite character is a character based on more than one individual from the story.

Examples

Film
Several characters in the movie 21.
Buffalo Bill in the film The Silence of the Lambs (based on the Thomas Harris novel of same name is a composite based on the serial killers Jerry Brudos, Ed Gein, Ted Bundy, Gary M. Heidnik, Edmund Kemper, and Gary Ridgway.
The character Henry Hurt in the docudrama Apollo 13 is portrayed as a NASA public relations employee assigned to the wife of astronaut Jim Lovell, and who also is seen answering reporters' questions. This character is a composite of the NASA protocol officer Bob McMurrey assigned to act as a buffer between the Lovell family and the press, and several Office of Public Affairs employees whose job was to actually work with the press.
Commander Bolton in the 2017 film Dunkirk is a composite of several real life people, including Commander James Campbell Clouston and Captain Bill Tennant.
The characters in the 1963 film The Great Escape are based on real men, and in some cases are composites of several men. The character Virgil Hilts, the "Cooler King," was based on at least three pilots, David M. Jones, John Dortch Lewis, and William Ash.
In Bombshell, Margot Robbie's character Kayla Pospisil was based on a number of conservative women who spoke to the filmmakers about Ailes' harassment. "We’re not revealing the people we talk to. We’re trying to protect them," director Jay Roach said of the project's sources.

Television
1st Lt. (later CPT) Colleen McMurphy on the television series China Beach was a composite of several real-life Army nurses who served in Vietnam.
Marshall Matt Dillon on Gunsmoke is a composite of several Old West Kansas lawmen.
Ulana Khomyuk in Chernobyl is a composite character created to represent "the many scientists who worked fearlessly and put themselves in a lot of danger to help solve the situation."

Literature
The three Herods in the Gospel of Luke and the Acts of the Apostles (Herod the Great (Luke 1:5), Herod Antipas (Luke 3:1; 9:7-9; 13:31-33; 23:5-12), and Herod Agrippa I (Acts 12:1-23)) are three separate historical rulers, but are portrayed as a single character in Herod as a Composite Character in Luke-Acts, described "as an actualization of Satan’s desire to impede the spread of the good news though his ["Herod’s"] rejection of the gospel message and through political persecution".
The Senator: My Ten Years with Ted Kennedy, a memoir by Richard E. Burke allegedly exposing various activities of U.S. Senator Ted Kennedy featured several composite characters associated with Kennedy's alleged drug use and sexual dalliances; the inclusion of such became a point of criticism for the book.

Journalism
A series of 1944 The New Yorker articles by Joseph Mitchell on New York's Fulton Fish Market which were presented as journalism. Once the stories were published in 1948 as the book Old Mr. Flood Mitchell disclosed that "Mr. Flood is not one man; combined in him are aspects of several old men who work or hang out in Fulton Fish Market, or who did in the past." Mitchell assigned his composite character his own birthday and his own love for the Bible and certain authors. In his introduction to Mr. Flood, Mitchell wrote, "I wanted these stories to be truthful rather than factual, but they are solidly based on facts."
John Hersey is said to have created a composite character in a Life magazine story, as did Alastair Reid for The New Yorker.
Vivian Gornick in 2003 said that she used composite characters in some of her articles for the Village Voice.

See also
Fictional character
Fictional location

References

Fictional characters by role in the narrative structure
Journalism ethics
Literary motifs